Sarab-e Qaleh Shahin (also Romanized as Sarāb-e Qal‘eh Shāhīn and Sarāb-e Qal‘eh-ye Shāhīn; also known as Sarāb-e Abūz̄ar) is a village in Qaleh Shahin Rural District, in the Central District of Sarpol-e Zahab County, Kermanshah Province, Iran. At the 2006 census, its population was 635, in 161 families.

References 

Populated places in Sarpol-e Zahab County